Men's Football at the 2019 South Asian Games was held in Kathmandu, Nepal from 2 December to 10 December 2019. It was the 13th edition of the tournament.

Venue

Participating nations

Squads

Each nation must submit a squad of 20 players, 17 of whom must be born on or after 1 January 1997, and three of whom can be older dispensation players.

Officials

Referees 
 MD Mizanur Rahman (Bangladesh) 
 Mohamed Javiz (Maldives) 
 Rahul Kumar Gupta (India) 
 Pema Tshewang (Bhutan) 
 Kasun Weerakkody Karage (Sri Lanka) 
 Kabin Byanjankar (Nepal) 
 Nabindra Maharjan (Nepal) 
 Shrawan Lama (Nepal)

Assistant Referees
 Sk Ikball Alam (Bangladesh) 
 Niushaad Mohamed (Maldives) 
 Vairamuthu Parasuraman (India) 
 Yonten Chophel (Bhutan) 
 Dayan Sendanayaka (Sri Lanka) 
 Rojen Shrestha (Nepal) 
 Padam Bhujel (Nepal) 
 Sahadev Shrestha (Nepal)
 Madhav Khatri (Nepal) 
 Naniram Thapamagar (Nepal)

Fixtures and results
All times are local, NST (UTC+05:45).

Round Robin stage

Gold medal match

Winner

Goalscorers

Final results

References

External links

2019 South Asian Games
2019 South Asian Games